The 1923 Southwestern Louisiana Bulldogs football team was an American football team that represented the Southwestern Louisiana Institute of Liberal and Technical Learning (now known as the University of Louisiana at Lafayette) in the Louisiana Intercollegiate Athletic Association during the 1923 college football season. In their fifth year under head coach T. R. Mobley, the team compiled a 7–3 record.

Schedule

References

Southwestern Louisiana
Louisiana Ragin' Cajuns football seasons
Southwestern Louisiana Bulldogs football